František Čapek (12 November 1914 – 17 June 1988) was a Czech sports shooter. He competed at the 1952 Summer Olympics and 1956 Summer Olympics.

References

External links
 

1914 births
1988 deaths
People from Hradec Králové District
People from the Kingdom of Bohemia
Czech male sport shooters
Olympic shooters of Czechoslovakia
Shooters at the 1952 Summer Olympics
Shooters at the 1956 Summer Olympics
Sportspeople from the Hradec Králové Region